Schizolaena parviflora is a tree in the family Sarcolaenaceae. It is endemic to Madagascar. The specific epithet  is from the Latin meaning "small flowers".

Description
Its inflorescences are small and dense. The involucre is glabrous. It is thought to attract lemurs, bats and birds who in turn disperse the tree's seeds. The fruit is considered edible.

Distribution and habitat
Schizolaena parviflora is known only from the northern regions of Diana and Sofia. Its habitat is subhumid forests from sea-level to  altitude. Some subpopulations of the species are in protected areas.

Uses
The timber of Schizolaena parviflora is used in construction and as firewood. It is also used to make charcoal.

Threats
Schizolaena parviflora is threatened by deforestation due to shifting patterns of agriculture. The species is also threatened by timber harvesting and wildfires.

References

parviflora
Endemic flora of Madagascar
Trees of Madagascar
Plants described in 1919